The 1917 Camp Custer football team was an American football team made up of United States Army officers from the 85th Infantry Division stationed at Camp Custer in Battle Creek, Michigan. The Camp Custer officers played games against professional football teams (the Fort Wayne Friars and Detroit Heralds) as well as other service teams.

Harry Costello, who won All-Southern honors while playing for Georgetown, was the team's quarterback. The team's backfield also included former Michigan Agricultural College stars Blake Miller and Neno DaPrato. William Jennings Gardner was the captain.

Fielding H. Yost of Michigan coached the Camp Custer team in the week leading up to the game with Camp Grant. Amos Alonzo Stagg and Fred J. Murphy coached the Camp Custer team. Ring Lardner attended the Camp Grant game and wrote a column describing the spectacle.

Schedule

Season overview

Game 5: Detroit Heralds
On November 11, Camp Custer defeated the Detroit Heralds, a professional football team starring Birtie Maher, Norb Sacksteder, Ray Whipple, Joe Windbiel, and Lou Usher, and that began playing in the National Football League in 1920.  The game drew a crowd of close to 15,000 persons at Navin Field. Camp Custer won by a 13-0 score. Right end Thompson scored a touchdown in the second quarter, and quarterback Harry Costello drop-kicked two field goals. Walter Eckersall was the referee.

References

Camp Custer
Camp Custer football